Atha Maga Rathiname is a 1994 Indian Tamil language drama film directed by Gangai Amaran. The film stars Selva, Ranjitha, Pandiyan and Viji. It was released on 9 December 1994.

Plot

Muniyandi (Selva) and Pandiamma (Ranjitha) have been in love for many years. Muniyandi always wins his village's bull race against Minor Rajapandi (Pandiyan). Rajapandi is the village's richest man and has an eye on Pandiamma. Muniyandi's mother Angamma looks for a bride for his son and she finally finds the daughter of a rich man Vijaya (Viji). Angamma then tries to split Muniyandi and Pandiamma. What transpires next forms the rest of the story.

Cast

Selva as Muniyandi
Ranjitha as Pandiamma
Pandiyan as Minor Rajapandi
Viji as Vijaya
Manorama as Pappamma
Ganthimathi as Angamma
Vadivelu
Vennira Aadai Moorthy
S. S. Sivaram
C. R. Saraswathi as Pudukkottai Sundari
Disco Shanti
Shanmugasundari
Suguna
Ramumachan
Kalaimani
Theni Shanmugam
Rajendran
Ravikanth

Soundtrack

The film score and the soundtrack were composed by Gangai Amaran. The soundtrack, released in 1994, features 7 tracks with lyrics written by, the director himself, Gangai Amaran.

References

1994 films
1990s Tamil-language films
Films scored by Gangai Amaran
Films directed by Gangai Amaran